Borg Massif is a mountain massif, about  long and with summits above , situated along the northwest side of the Penck Trough in Queen Maud Land, East Antarctica. The parallel, ice-filled Raudberg Valley and Frostlendet Valley trend northeastward through the massif, dividing its summits into three rough groups:

Discovery and naming
The feature was photographed from the air by the Third German Antarctic Expedition (1938–1939), led by Captain Alfred Ritscher, but was not correctly shown on the maps by the expedition. It was mapped in detail by Norwegian cartographers from surveys and air photos by the Norwegian–British–Swedish Antarctic Expedition (1949–1952), led by John Schjelderup Giæver. It was remapped by air photos taken by the Sixth Norwegian Antarctic Expedition (1958–1959). They named it "Borgmassivet" (the castle massif) in association with Borg Mountain, its most prominent feature.

Features
Located at the northern end of the Borg Massif is the summit of Borg Mountain, a large, flattish, ice-topped mountain with many exposed rock cliffs.
Located at the northeastern end of the Borg Massif is the summit of Ytstenut Peak. The name "Ytstenut" means "outermost peak" in the Norwegian language.
Located at the southern end of the Borg Massif is the summit of Hogfonna Mountain. The name "Hogfonna" means "the high snowfield" in the Norwegian language.

See also
 Flesa Rock
 List of mountains of Queen Maud Land
 Ruvungane Peaks
 Småtind Peak
 Stridbukken Mountain

References

External links
 Scientific Committee on Antarctic Research (SCAR)
 Composite Gazetteer of Antarctica
 

Mountains of Queen Maud Land